The 2022 Erovnuli Liga or Crystalbet Erovnuli Liga 2022 (formerly known as Umaglesi Liga) was the 34th season of top-tier football in Georgia. Dinamo Batumi were the defending champions.

Teams and stadiums

Changes
Sioni Bolnisi (promoted after a two-year absence) and Gagra (promoted after a ten-year absence) were promoted from the 2021 Erovnuli Liga 2. FC Samtredia (relegated after two years in the top flight) and Shukura Kobuleti (relegated after one year in the top flight) have been relegated to 2022 Erovnuli Liga 2.

Personnel and kits

League table

Results
Each team will play the other nine teams home and away twice, for a total of 36 games each.

Round 1–18

Round 19–36

Relegation play-offs

Season statistics

Top scorers

References

External links
 Soccerway

Erovnuli Liga seasons
1
Georgia
Georgia